Henry Dawnay, 2nd Viscount Downe (7 June 1664 – 21 May 1741), styled The Honourable Henry Dawnay between 1681 and 1695, was an English Tory politician who sat in the English House of Commons between 1690 and 1707 and in the British House of Commons from 1708 to 1727.

Dawnay was the son of John Dawnay, 1st Viscount Downe, by his second wife Dorothy, daughter of William Johnson, of Wickham, Lancashire.

Dawnay succeeded his father as Member of Parliament for Pontefract in 1690, a seat he held until 1695. In 1695, he also succeeded his father in the viscountcy. As this was an Irish peerage it did not entitle him to a seat in the English House of Lords (although it did entitle him to a seat in the Irish House of Lords).  He was consequently eligible for election to the English House of Commons and in 1698 he was elected Member of Parliament for Yorkshire, a seat he held until 1700. He was returned as MP for Yorkshire at a by-election in December 1707 and was re-elected MP for Yorkshire at the 1708 general election. He was elected again in 1710, 1713, and 1715   1722.

Lord Downe married Mildred, daughter of William Godfrey, of Thornock, Lincolnshire, in 1685. She died in August 1725. Downe remained a widower until his death in May 1741, aged 76. He was succeeded in the viscountcy by his grandson, Henry, his son the Honourable John Dawnay having predeceased him.

Ancestry chart

References

1664 births
1741 deaths
Viscounts in the Peerage of Ireland
English MPs 1690–1695
English MPs 1698–1700
British MPs 1707–1708
British MPs 1708–1710
British MPs 1710–1713
British MPs 1713–1715
British MPs 1715–1722
British MPs 1722–1727
Henry